Čanje is a settlement in the hills above Blanca in the Municipality of Sevnica in central Slovenia. The area is part of the historical region of Styria. The municipality is now included in the Lower Sava Statistical Region.

Churches
There are two churches in the settlement. One on a hill just southwest of the hamlet of Gradec is dedicated to Saint Agnes and dates to the 13th century with a 19th-century belfry. The second stands on Gradec Hill east of the hamlet of Brinje. It dates to the 14th century and is dedicated to the Virgin Mary. Both belong to the parish of Sevnica.

Notable people
Notable people that were born or lived in Čanje include:
Mavricij Teraš (sl) (1889–1960), theologian

References

External links
Čanje at Geopedia

Populated places in the Municipality of Sevnica